Marudur is a panchayat town in Karur district in the Indian state of Tamil Nadu.Mrs. Janaki ammal wife of mathematician Srinivasan Ramanujan hails from this village near to mardur railway station.

Demographics
 India census, Marudur in Karur District, Tamil Nadu, had a population of 10,205. Males constitute 49% of the population and females 51%. Marudur has an average literacy rate of 60%, higher than the national average of 59.5%: male literacy is 71%, and female literacy is 49%. In Marudur, 11% of the population is under 6 years of age.

References

Cities and towns in Karur district